Allan Kardeck dos Santos Pereira also known as Allan Kardeck (born May 16, 1982) is a  Brazilian footballer who currently plays for Nicaraguan side Real Estelí.

Notes

External links

1982 births
Living people
Association football forwards
Brazilian footballers
America Football Club (RJ) players
Goiás Esporte Clube players
Sociedade Esportiva Palmeiras players
C.F. Estrela da Amadora players
Friburguense Atlético Clube players
C.D. Olimpia players
C.D. Suchitepéquez players
Comunicaciones F.C. players
A.D. Isidro Metapán footballers
Hibernians F.C. players
Expatriate footballers in Portugal
Expatriate footballers in Honduras
Expatriate footballers in Guatemala
Expatriate footballers in El Salvador
Expatriate footballers in Malta
Expatriate footballers in Nicaragua
Brazilian expatriate sportspeople in Portugal
Brazilian expatriate sportspeople in Honduras
Brazilian expatriate sportspeople in Guatemala
Brazilian expatriate sportspeople in El Salvador
Brazilian expatriate sportspeople in Malta
Footballers from Rio de Janeiro (city)